The Alfred E. Robindreau House is a historic house in Arlington, Massachusetts.  This house, built c. 1920 and first occupied by a poultry dealer, is a rare well-preserved -story hip-roofed Craftsman/Bungalow-style house in a neighborhood generally filled with Shingle and Colonial Revival houses.  It has a hip-roofed front porch supported by clusters of columns mounted on fieldstone piers, and a chimney on the side with an exposed fieldstone base.  The eaves of the roof have exposed rafter ends.

The house was listed on the National Register of Historic Places in 1985.

See also
National Register of Historic Places listings in Arlington, Massachusetts

References

Houses on the National Register of Historic Places in Arlington, Massachusetts
Houses in Arlington, Massachusetts